Cathy Lisa Schneider is an American author and professor of urban politics, comparative social movements, and criminal justice. She is a professor at the American University School of International Service.

Education

Schneider completed a bachelor of arts and master of arts at University at Albany, SUNY. She earned a master of arts and Ph.D. at Cornell University.

Career 
Schneider writes and teaches about political violence, urban politics, and comparative social movements. She writes on criminal justice and racial and ethic discrimination in Latin America, Europe, and the United States. She is a professor at  the American University School of International Service.

Selected works

References

External links
 
 

21st-century American women writers
American University faculty and staff
Cornell University alumni
University at Albany, SUNY alumni
Year of birth missing (living people)
Living people
American women academics